The men's sprint was a track cycling event held as part of the Cycling at the 1964 Summer Olympics programme. It was held on 17 and 18 October 1964 at the Hachioji Velodrome. 39 cyclists from 22 nations competed. Nations were limited to two cyclists each. The event was won by Giovanni Pettenella of Italy, the nation's second consecutive and fourth overall victory in the men's sprint (trailing only France's five gold medals all-time). Sergio Bianchetto took silver, making it the second consecutive Games in which Italy had two men on the podium in the event. It was also the fifth straight Games with Italy taking at least silver. Daniel Morelon of France took bronze, the first of his record four medals in the event.

Background

This was the 13th appearance of the event, which has been held at every Summer Olympics except 1904 and 1912. None of the quarterfinalists from 1960 returned. Italy and France, which had combined for 8 of the 12 previous gold medals, had strong teams. France was favored, with Pierre Trentin and Daniel Morelon the top two at the 1964 World Championship. Third place had gone to Italian Sergio Bianchetto, who had also won Olympic gold in the tandem in 1960. The other Italian, Giovanni Pettenella, was less well-known but had taken silver in the track time trial earlier in the Games. Belgium also had a strong contender, with 1963 World Champion Patrick Sercu.

Cambodia made its debut in the men's sprint. France made its 13th appearance, the only nation to have competed at every appearance of the event.

Competition format

Sprint cycling involves a series of head-to-head matches. The 1964 competition involved nine rounds: heats, a two-round repechage, 1/8 finals, another two-round repechage, quarterfinals, semifinals, and finals.

 Heats: The 39 competitors were divided into 13 heats of 3 cyclists each. The winner of each heat advanced directly to the 1/8 finals (13 cyclists), while all other cyclists who competed were sent to the first repechage (26 cyclists).
 Repechage 1: This was a two-round repechage. The first round consisted of 10 heats of 2 or 3 cyclists each. The winners advanced to the second round of the repechage, while the losers were eliminated. The second round had 5 heats of 2 cyclists each; the winner of each heat joined the main competition again at the 1/8 finals (5 cyclists) while the loser was eliminated.
 1/8 finals: The 18 cyclists who advanced through the heats or the first repechage competed in a 1/8 finals round. There were 6 heats in this round, with 3 cyclists in each. The top cyclist in each heat advanced to the quarterfinals (6 cyclists), while the other 2 in each heat went to the second repechage (12 cyclists).
 Repechage 2: This was another two-round repechage. This repechage began with 4 heats of 3 cyclists each. The top cyclist in each heat advanced to the second round, while the other 2 cyclists in each heat were eliminated. The second round of this repechage featured 2 heats of 2 cyclists each, with the winners advancing to the quarterfinals and the losers eliminated.
 Quarterfinals: Beginning with the quarterfinals, all matches were one-on-one competitions and were held in best-of-three format. There were 4 quarterfinals, with the winner of each advancing to the semifinals and the loser eliminated.
 Semifinals: The two semifinals provided for advancement to the gold medal final for winners and to the bronze medal final for losers.
 Finals: Both a gold medal final and a bronze medal final were held.

Records

The records for the sprint are 200 metre flying time trial records, kept for the qualifying round in later Games as well as for the finish of races.

No new world or Olympic records were set during the competition.

Schedule

All times are Japan Standard Time (UTC+9)

Results

Round 1

In the first round of heats, the 39 cyclists were divided into 13 heats of 3 cyclists each. The winner of each heat advanced to the 1/8 finals, while the 26 remaining cyclists were relegated to the first round of repechages.

Heat 1

Heat 2

Heat 3

Heat 4

Heat 5

Heat 6

Heat 7

Heat 8

Heat 9

Heat 10

Heat 11

Heat 12

Heat 13

First repechage semifinals

All of the competitors who had not qualified for the 1/8 finals in the heats competed in the first round repechage. Ten heats, each with 2 or 3 cyclists, were held. The winner of each heat moved on to the first round repechage finals, all others (16 in all) were eliminated.

First repechage semifinal 1

First repechage semifinal 2

First repechage semifinal 3

First repechage semifinal 4

First repechage semifinal 5

First repechage semifinal 6

First repechage semifinal 7

First repechage semifinal 8

First repechage semifinal 9

First repechage semifinal 10

First repechage finals

The winners of the 10 heats of the elimination round of the first repechage competed against each other in 5 heats of repechage finals. The winners of the five heats advanced to the 1/8 finals, the losers were eliminated.

First repechage final 1

First repechage final 2

First repechage final 3

First repechage final 4

First repechage final 5

1/8 finals

The 18 remaining cyclists competed in 6 heats of 3 cyclists in the 1/8 finals. The winner of each heat advanced to the quarterfinals, with the 2 defeated cyclists in each heat relegated to the second round of repechages.

1/8 final 1

1/8 final 2

1/8 final 3

1/8 final 4

1/8 final 5

1/8 final 6

Second repechage semifinals

Four heats of three cyclists each were held, with the winner of each moving to the finals of the second repechage while the other 8 cyclists were eliminated.

Second repechage semifinal 1

Second repechage semifinal 2

Second repechage semifinal 3

Second repechage semifinal 4

Second repechage finals

The four winners of the eliminations of the second repechage faced off in two heats of finals for the repechage. The winner in each heat moved on to the semifinals, the loser was eliminated.

Second repechage final 1

Second repechage final 2

Quarterfinals

The quarterfinals, which began the day of 19 October, were the first round of direct elimination. The 8 remaining cyclists were paired off into four heats. The winner of each match, which was in a best-of-three format, advanced, the loser was eliminated.

Quarterfinal 1

Quarterfinal 2

Quarterfinal 3

Quarterfinal 4

Semifinals

The semifinals were also raced in a best-of-three format. The winner of each semifinal advanced to the gold medal match, while the loser was sent to the bronze medal match.

Semifinal 1

Trentin was penalized for interference in the second race.

Semifinal 2

During their semifinal, Pettenella and Trentin set an Olympic record by standing still for 21 minutes and 57 seconds.

Finals

The two finals each pitted a pair of countrymen against each other; Italians in the gold medal match and Frenchmen in the bronze. Again the format was best-of-three.

Bronze medal match

Final

Sources

References

Cycling at the Summer Olympics – Men's sprint
Track cycling at the 1964 Summer Olympics